Thalamarchella aneureta is a moth in the family Depressariidae. It was described by Ian Francis Bell Common in 1964. It is found in Australia, where it has been recorded from Western Australia.

References

Moths described in 1964
Thalamarchella